Pilarczyk is a surname. Notable people with the surname include:

 Daniel Edward Pilarczyk (1934-2020), American Roman Catholic archbishop
 Helga Pilarczyk (1926–2011), German operatic soprano
 Ryszard Pilarczyk (born 1975), Polish sprinter

Polish-language surnames